Jamie Lomas (born 18 October 1977 in Chesterfield, England) is a footballer who played in The Football League for Chesterfield and Mansfield Town.

Career
Lomas started his career at his local team Chesterfield however despite spending eight years at Saltergate he only made 38 appearances and scored one goal which came in a shock 2–1 defeat to non-league Enfield in the FA Cup. He left to join local rivals Mansfield Town in May 2000. His career was ended by a serious knee ligament which he ironically suffered on his return to Chesterfield in the Miners Derby. He never recovered and retired from football.

References

English footballers
Chesterfield F.C. players
Mansfield Town F.C. players
English Football League players
1977 births
Living people
Association football midfielders